Ruth Wallace (born 1 February 1993) is an Australian rules football player who plays for Norwood Football Club in the SANFL Women's League. She is also former soccer player who played for Adelaide United in the Australian W-League.

In 2014, Wallace ran the New York Marathon as part of the Indigenous Marathon Project.

References

Australian women's soccer players
Living people
Adelaide United FC (A-League Women) players
A-League Women players
1991 births
Australian rules footballers from South Australia
Adelaide Football Club (AFLW) players
Indigenous Australian players of Australian rules football
Women's association football midfielders